Nuvei is a global payments technology company with headquarters in Montreal. Nuvei provides businesses with pay-in and payout options including card issuing, banking, risk and fraud management services, and enables them to accept more than 570 alternative payment methods. The company went public in September 2020 with a $700 million initial public offering on the Toronto Stock Exchange. At the time, the Canadian IPO was the largest ever technology company offering on the Toronto Stock Exchange. A year later, in October 2021, Nuvei closed a $424.8 million IPO on Nasdaq.

History 
Nuvei, formerly Pivotal Payments, was established in 2003 by Philip Fayer. Fayer founded the company while taking some time off from attending Concordia University. The company offered electronic payment processing and merchant services for point of sale and online businesses. Since its founding, Nuvei has expanded significantly, acquiring clients and other similar operations through acquisitions.

In 2006, the company received an investment from Goldman Sachs totaling CA$60 million to fund its acquisition strategy, which helped the company execute several acquisitions by 2010. By this time, the company had grown to about 300 employees in Canada and the United States and reported a yearly revenue of CA$150 million.

In September 2017, Montreal-based private equity firm Novacap and the public pension fund manager Caisse de dépôt et placement du Québec announced a joint investment in the company. During the funding series, the two investment firms valued the company at CA$525 million (US$424 million).

In August 2019, Nuvei completed its acquisition of SafeCharge for CA$1.1 billion (US$889 million), based on the price of US$5.55 for each SafeCharge share, representing a 25% premium to the London-listed company's stock.

In September 2020, the company raised US$700 million in the largest technology initial public offering to date on the Toronto Stock Exchange.

In November 2020, Nuvei completed the acquisition of Smart2Pay as part of a drive to strengthen its presence in high-growth digital commerce verticals. A month later in December 2020, Nuvei announced it was acquiring Base Commerce, a payment processing company specializing in bankcard and ACH payment processing.

In August 2021, Nuvei completed the acquisition of payment provider Mazooma, a transaction to expand its portfolio of North American payment options, with instant bank-to-bank payments for pay-ins and payouts, as well as real time payments for accelerated withdrawals. In September 2021, Nuvei acquired payments company Paymentez to expand in Latin America.

In October 2021, Nuvei filed for an IPO on Nasdaq.

Nuvei's annual results for the 12 months to the end of December 2021 published in March 2022 showed the combined organization processes over $95 billion in annual transaction volume from clients across the globe.

In January 2023, Nuvei announced that it plans to buy Nasdaq-listed competitor Paya Holdings Inc. for approximately US$1.3-billion.

References

External links 
 

Companies based in Montreal
Companies listed on the Toronto Stock Exchange
Financial services companies of Canada
Canadian companies established in 2003
Financial services companies established in 2003
2021 initial public offerings